The following is a history of the programming that has aired on Alter Channel from Greece:

Children, teens and young people
64 Zoo Lane
The Adventures of Blinky Bill
All-New Dennis the Menace
Alienators-Evolution Continues
Angelina Ballerina
Angry Beavers
Animal Stories
Anne of Green Gables
Aoki Densetsu Shoot!
Archie's Weird Mysteries
Arthur (Seasons 1-9)
Babar
Baby Triplets
Bakugan
Bananas in Pyjamas
Barney & Friends
Battle B Daman
Bear in the Big Blue House
Becassine
Benjamin the Elephant
The Berenstain Bears
Beyblade
Beyblade V-Force
Bibi Blocksberg
Billy and Buddy
Bob the Builder
Bratz
Butt-Ugly Martians
Caillou
Captain Pugwash
Care Bears  
Care Bears: Adventures in Care-a-lot
Casper
Cédric
Charley and Mimmo
Clifford the Big Red Dog
Clifford's Puppy Days
Code Lyoko
Cotoons
Digimon Adventure 02, Digimon Frontier and Digimon Tamers (all under the title "Digimon")
Donkey Kong Country
Dream Street
Duel Masters
Engie Benjy
The Fairytaler
Fantaghiro
Fantastic Four
Fifi and the Flowertots
Finley The Fire Engine
Fireman Sam
Fix and Foxi
Flipper
Football Stories
Franklin
Galactik Football
Garfield and Friends
George Of The Jungle
Gormiti
Gundam Wing
Hamtaro
Harry and His Bucket Full of Dinosaurs
HarveyToons Show
He-Man and the Masters of the Universe 
Heidi, Girl of the Alps
Hello Kitty
Hey Arnold!                                                                                                   
Horseland
Hot Wheels Battle Force 5
Huntik
Iznogoud
Jacques Cousteau's Ocean Tales 
Kipper
The Koala Brothers
Kung Foot
The New Adventures Of Spirou And Fantasio
The Little Lulu Show (Seasons 1-2)
Little Monsters                                                                                                
Legend of The Dragon
Little People
Little Red Tractor
Lucky Luke
MacDonald's Farm
Maggie and the Ferocious Beast
The Magic Key
Make Way For Noddy
The Adventures Of Marco And Gina
Marsupilami
Martin Mystery
Mary-Kate and Ashley in Action
Maya the Bee
Medabots
Megaman NT Warrior
Mew Mew Power
Microscopic Milton
Miffy
Miss Spider's Sunny Patch Friends
Mr. Men and Little Miss
Magic Adventures of Mumfie
Muppet Babies
My Little PonyMy Little Pony TalesThe New Adventures of Lucky LukeThe New Adventures of Ocean GirlOggy and the CockroachesOne PiecePapa Beaver's StorytimePapyrus
Peter Pan
PimpaPinguPippi LongstockingPolly PocketPolochonPostman PatPotato Head Kids
Power Rangers Ninja StormPrincess SissiRainbow FishRoary the Racing CarRocket PowerRolie Polie OlieRubbadubbersRupert and Rupert Bear, Follow the Magic...Sabrina's Secret Life Sagwa, the Chinese Siamese CatSanbarbe le Pirate SandokanThe Adventures of Sidney FoxSilver Surfer
Slam Dunk
Speed Racer: The Next Generation
Spider-Man: The Animated Series
Spider-Man: The New Animated SeriesStrawberry ShortcakeSylvanian FamiliesTabalugaTeam GalaxyTeenage Mutant Ninja TurtlesThomas the Tank EngineTimbuctooThe Adventures of TintinThe Hoobs  The Spooktacular New Adventures of CasperThe New Adventures of Madeline 
The Princess of NileThe Woody Woodpecker ShowTiteufTom and PipoTotally SpiesTractor TomTransformers AnimatedTransformers ArmadaTransformers EnergonTransformers CybertronThe TripletsTroll TalesTroTroValerian & Laureline Vicky the VikingWinx ClubWolverine and the X-MenYakariYolanda Daughter of the Black CorsairEntertainment/serials
 Agpnies – A variety show with all sorts of entertainment from song, dance, theatre, beauty contests, magic shows, jugglers and any other weird thing that piques the curiosity of the viewers. Hosted by Annita Pania.(2002-2006)
 Je T'aime – hosted by Annita Pania (2006–2008)
 Kodikas Da Mitsi - A satirical sketch comedy show with comedian George Mitsikostas. Sketches poke fun at politicians and journalists, including a look at the current issues making headlines. (2006-2007)
 Lifestyle – A look at the magical world of Greek and international show biz. From events and personalities that dominate the headlines, exclusive videos, interviews with famous people and a look at all the latest trends. Hosted by Betty Maggira, airs Saturdays at 12:30 pm. (2003–2011)
 Μitsi Xosta - sketch comedy show with comedian George Mitsikostas (2001-2006)
 Number One – A look at the Greek music scene, with news and reports as well as exclusive interviews with all the hottest stars. Hosted by Artemis Kokkinara. (2005-2007)
 Proina Gossip – news about the entertainment world (2005)
 Stin Kouzina Me Tin Vefa - cooking show with celebrity chef Vefa Alexiadou (2006–2007)
 To Party Tis Zois Sou – An entertainment show featuring distinguished personalities from politics, the arts and show biz, who get together and celebrate, reminisce about old times, talk about their lives and experiences, and sing and dance.  Hosted by Akis Paulopoulos. (2003-2009)
 Top Secret – An entertainment program that features lively guests, jokes and  original games with many gifts, mixed in with music, dancing and an all around good time. Hosted by Dessu Kouvelogianni. (2004-2006)
 VIP – gossip news; hosted by Maria Siniori  (2004–2005)

Serialselies throumbes - sitcom (2004-2005)Giannaki omorfopaido - sitcom (2006)H gi tis evagelias - sitcom (cancelled before airing)Horevodas me tous zaralikous - sitcom (2004)I Limni Ton Stenagmon - drama (2005-2006)Koritsia... o Markoulis - sitcom (2005)Mexri 3 einai desmos - sitcom (2004-2005)Pame epitheorisi - sitcom (2005)Sovarotis Miden - sitcom (2003)xires club - sitcom (2004-2005)Zouga symmory - sitcom (2001)

Foreign

Current seriesEureka (2010) (2011 only reruns)Flash Gordon (2010) (2011 only reruns)Friday Night Lights (2010) (2011 only reruns)Heroes (Season 1 2007-2008) (Season 1 reruns 2008-2010) (Seasons 2-3 from July 2011)Karen Sisco (2010) (2011 only reruns)Lipstick Jungle (2009-2010) (2011 only reruns)Mad Men (2009-2010) (2011 only reruns)

Previously airedAndromeda (2002-2004)Angela Eyes (2006) (2009 only reruns)The Black DonnellysCSI (2003-2009)Esmeralda - Latin American telenovela (2006)Grey's Anatomy (2005-2008) (Season 1-2)Hercules: The Legendary Journeys (2006-2009)Largo Winch (2004-2006)Maria la del barrio (2006)Mister Sterling (2009)Nash Bridges (2002-2004)Raines (2009)Paulina (La Usurpadora) (2006)Sex and the City (2002-2008)Surface (2007-2008) (2009 only reruns)Xena: Warrior Princess (2006-2009)

News/informationApotypomata - Investigative reports that delve into problems facing society today. Host Antonis Papadopoulos and his team of journalists analyse the issues and attempt to bring to light those things that others want to suppress. Airs Sundays at 11:30pm (2006–present)Αtheatos Kosmos - Informative talk show that tries to shed light on all the major issues affecting society, includes reports, testimonies and documentaries. Hosted by Kosta Xardavella. (2003–present)Auto Alter - all the news from the world of automobiles, with a look at the all the latest models, test drives, smart buying tips, accessories and moreDocumento - documentary series (2005)Η Foni Tou Politi - current affairs program that looks at all the issues that affect Greeks todayΚathares Kouventes - Informative program that looks at news headlines, social issues and more. Hosted by Giorgo Varemeno and Magda Tsegkou; airs Monday - Friday at 10am. (2004-2006)Οi Pyles Tou Anexhgitou - Informative discussion that examines issues and events that remain unsolved, a look at the unexplained. With the help of leading scientists, researchers and specialized teams, the program sheds light on the travels of the soul, issues from the archives of science that were labelled as 'unexplained' and on messages from the past and the future.  Hosted by Kostas Xardavellas. (?-2010)Olikh Epanafora - Weekly informative discussion about all the major issues from politics to social concerns; features various guests in studio. Hosted by Giannis Loverdos, airs weekly. (2005-2006)Sti Veranta - Late night talk show that features interviews with well-known social and artistic personalities. Hosted by Niko Mouratidis. (2006)Ta Leme Ola - Political affairs discussion with a panel of guests, features exclusive reports, analysis and a look at the news of the day. Hosted by Giannis Loverdos; airs Monday - Friday at 6:45am. (2006)Ta Mystika Tis Ygeis - a look at all the latest health news with Stefanos Karagiannopoulos (2001-2008)To Kleidi Tis Eutixias - Informative program that aims to help people overcome the problems they are facing in their lives and make their hopes and dreams come true. Through the help of private citizens, businesses and institutions, viewers overcome the obstacles and find solutions to their problems. Hosted by Kostas Xardavellas. (2006)ΤΡΩΩ Υgiena'' - A look at diet and health with dietician/nutritionist Mano Kazamia. He informs and gives advice about how to live a healthy lifestyle.

Alter Channel